The Priority R-tree is a worst-case asymptotically optimal alternative to the spatial tree R-tree. It was first proposed by Arge, De Berg, Haverkort and Yi, K. in an article from 2004. The prioritized R-tree is essentially a hybrid between a k-dimensional tree and a r-tree in that it defines a given object's N-dimensional bounding volume (called Minimum Bounding Rectangles - MBR) as a point in N-dimensions, represented by the ordered pair of the rectangles. The term prioritized arrives from the introduction of four priority-leaves that represents the most extreme values of each dimensions, included in every branch of the tree. Before answering a window-query by traversing the sub-branches, the prioritized R-tree first checks for overlap in its priority nodes. The sub-branches are traversed (and constructed) by checking whether the least value of the first dimension of the query is above the value of the sub-branches. This gives access to a quick indexation by the value of the first dimension of the bounding box.

Performance 
Arge et al. writes that the priority tree always answers window-queries with
 I/Os, where N is the number of d-dimensional (hyper-) rectangles stored in the R-tree, B is the disk block size, and T is the output size.

Dimensions 

See also 
 Bounding volume hierarchy
 B-tree
 R-tree

References 

R-tree
Database index techniques